LL Flooring (formerly Lumber Liquidators Flooring) is an American retailer of hard-surface flooring including hardwood flooring, laminate flooring, vinyl plank flooring, tile flooring, bamboo flooring and cork flooring, as well as flooring tools and accessories.

History

Founding
Lumber Liquidators Flooring was started in 1994 by Tom Sullivan, a building contractor who began purchasing excess wood from other companies. He then resold the wood from the back of a trucking firm's yard in Stoughton, Massachusetts. Three years later in 1996, the company found their niche market in hardwood flooring. On January 5, 1996, the company's first store opened in West Roxbury, Massachusetts, and sold 150 square feet of floors on the first day. By August of that year, they opened up a second store in Hartford, Connecticut.

Expansion
The company has grown to be one of the largest retailers of hardwood flooring in the United States. It expanded to more than 375 Lumber Liquidators stores with over 1,000 employees in 47 states and Canada. It also launched online e-commerce, catalogs, and its Virginia call center. By the end of 2018 the company was operating over 415 stores across North America.

The company is currently headquartered in Richmond, Virginia. The company's CEO is Charles E. Tyson. The firm is listed and trades under .  In 2019 the company announced it would be moving the corporate offices from Toano to Richmond VA.

In 2009, Lumber Liquidators began receiving sponsorship from Scripps’ HGTV, DIY Network and ABC’s Extreme Makeover: Home Edition.

The company expanded into Canada in the fourth quarter of 2010. The expansion plan was to add 36 to 40 stores.

In April 2020, the company publicly rebranded itself, changing its name to LL Flooring. On Dec.10, 2021, it announced the corporate entity name change to LL Flooring Holdings, Inc. would officially take effect January 1, 2022.

Controversies
A 2013 report by the Environmental Investigation Agency revealed that Lumber Liquidators' indiscriminate and poor sourcing practices resulted in the destruction of critically endangered tiger habitats and forests.

Further investigation led to the conviction of a Russian supplier in 2014.  Shortly after the conviction Lumber Liquidators lost about twenty percent in stock value for potential violation of the Lacey Act.  During 2015, the company's stock lost about half of its value in both the leadup to and the wake of a “60 Minutes” report about unsafe levels of formaldehyde in the Chinese-made laminate flooring that it was selling. A number of class action lawsuits were brought on by customers, due to the formaldehyde issue and other customer service issues.

On June 16, 2015, Lumber Liquidators announced the "unexpected" resignation of its CEO, Robert Lynch. It also announced the termination of its Chief Merchandising Officer, William Schlegel. It also declared it would discontinue the sale of laminate flooring products manufactured in China.

The company's founder, Tom Sullivan, served as interim CEO following the resignation and was replaced in November 2015 by John Presley.

On October 22, 2015, Lumber Liquidators pleaded guilty in federal court to the illegal importation of hardwood flooring. In February 2016, a federal judge sentenced the company to $13.15 million in penalties, consisting of $7.8 million in criminal fines, $3.15 million in civil forfeiture, $1 million in criminal forfeiture, and $1.2 million to conservation organizations. It was the largest financial penalty ever issued for violating the Lacey Act of 1900.

References

External links 

Home improvement retailers of the United States
American companies established in 1994
Retail companies established in 1994
Forest products companies of the United States
Companies based in Virginia
Companies listed on the New York Stock Exchange
1994 establishments in Massachusetts